Be My Wife is a 1919 American short comedy film featuring Harold Lloyd.

Cast
 Harold Lloyd as the boy
 Snub Pollard
 Bebe Daniels
 Sammy Brooks
 Lige Conley (as Lige Cromley)
 Bud Jamison
 Dee Lampton
 Marie Mosquini
 Fred C. Newmeyer (as Fred Newmeyer)
 Charles Stevenson
 Noah Young

See also
 List of American films of 1919
 Harold Lloyd filmography

External links

1919 films
1919 short films
1919 comedy films
American silent short films
American black-and-white films
Films directed by Hal Roach
Silent American comedy films
Films with screenplays by H. M. Walker
American comedy short films
1910s American films